Edmund Henry Parker, 2nd Earl of Morley (10 June 181028 August 1864), styled Viscount Boringdon from 1817 to 1840, was a British peer and Whig politician.

Early life 
Morley was the son of John Parker, 1st Earl of Morley and his second wife Frances Talbot, and was educated at Christ Church, Oxford.

Career 
In 1840 Morley succeeded his father as second Earl of Morley and took his seat on the Whig benches in the House of Lords. He was appointed Colonel of the South Devon Militia on 8 January 1845 and held the post until it was abolished in 1852. From 1846 to 1852 he served as a Lord-in-waiting (government whip in the House of Lords) in the Whig administration of Lord John Russell. Morley was also a Deputy Lieutenant of Devon and a Lord of the Bedchamber to Prince Albert.

Personal life 
Lord Morley married his second cousin Harriet Sophia, daughter of Montagu Edmund Parker, in 1842 and widow of William Coryton Esq. (d. 1836).

Death 
Morley died in August 1864, aged 54, and was succeeded in his titles by his son Albert, who became a prominent Liberal politician. Dowager Morley died in 1897.

Notes

References

Kidd, Charles, Williamson, David (editors). Debrett's Peerage and Baronetage (1990 edition). New York: St Martin's Press, 1990, 

www.thepeerage.com

1810 births
1864 deaths
2
Whig (British political party) Lords-in-Waiting
British Militia officers
Devon Militia officers